The 2015 European Le Mans Series season was the twelfth season of the Automobile Club de l'Ouest's (ACO) European Le Mans Series. The five-event season began at Silverstone Circuit, in conjunction with the FIA World Endurance Championship, on 11 April and finished at Autódromo do Estoril on 18 October.

In the lead LMP2 class, three teams did battle for the championship title; Greaves Motorsport, Thiriet by TDS Racing and Jota Sport. Jota Sport, and drivers Filipe Albuquerque, Simon Dolan and Harry Tincknell led the standings into the final race at Estoril, having won previously at the Red Bull Ring. However, it was Greaves Motorsport with the triumvirate of Gary Hirsch, Jon Lancaster and Björn Wirdheim who won the championship title; after winning at Silverstone, and Le Castellet, the trio finished second to Thiriet by TDS Racing in Estoril to secure the title by two points. Thiriet by TDS Racing's victory in Portugal – the team's second after a previous win at Imola – also allowed them to move ahead of Jota Sport in the teams' standings, with Ludovic Badey and Pierre Thiriet finishing as runners-up in the drivers' championship standings. Badey and Thiriet's victories were shared with Tristan Gommendy at Imola and Nicolas Lapierre at Estoril. In the new-for-2015 LMP3 class, Lawrence Tomlinson's Team LNT outfit won four of the five races during the season; three of which were won by former cyclist Chris Hoy and his teammate Charlie Robertson as they won the championship title with a round to spare. Hoy and Robertson finished 35 points clear of another Team LNT driver Gaëtan Paletou, who won the final race of the season with Michael Simpson at Estoril. Third place in the championship went to SVK by Speed Factory, and their drivers Konstantīns Calko and Dainius Matijošaitis. LNT's only defeat during the season occurred at Imola, when Morten Dons and Rob Garofall won for the University of Bolton team.

Successive victories at the Red Bull Ring and Le Castellet allowed the Formula Racing team with drivers Johnny Laursen, Mikkel Mac and Andrea Rizzoli to clinch their respective LMGTE championship titles. They won the championship by four points from the BMW Sports Trophy Marc VDS outfit of Henry Hassid, Jesse Krohn and Andy Priaulx, who were the race winners at Estoril. Third place in the championship went to the AF Corse team of Duncan Cameron, Matt Griffin and Aaron Scott. Two other teams won races during the season; Gulf Racing UK won on home soil at Silverstone with an all-British crew of Adam Carroll, Phil Keen and Michael Wainwright, while AT Racing won at Imola with the father-and-son crew of Alexander Talkanitsa Jr. and Alexander Talkanitsa Sr. along with Alessandro Pier Guidi.

While in GTC, TDS Racing finished 20 points clear of their closest rivals to take the respective titles in the class. The all-French crew of Eric Dermont, Dino Lunardi and Franck Perera won two races at Silverstone and at Le Castellet, and sealed the title with second at Estoril. Second place in the championship went to another crew that won two races during the season; Francesco Castellacci and Stuart Hall won successive races at Imola and the Red Bull Ring for AF Corse, sharing victories with Rino Mastronardi (Imola) and Thomas Flohr (Red Bull Ring). Another AF Corse crew finished in third in the drivers' championship, as Francisco Guedes and Mads Rasmussen were able to fend off Marco Cioci, Ilya Melnikov and Giorgio Roda for the position despite the latter trio winning the final race at Estoril.

Regulations
The 2015 season saw the introduction of the new LMP3 class, which was announced by the ACO during the 2014 season. The aim of the new class was to introduce young drivers and teams to endurance racing before they progressed to the higher classes of prototype racing, LMP2 and ultimately LMP1.

The chassis, which could be built by any constructor, was powered by a 5-litre normally-aspirated V8 Nissan VK50 engine, producing 420hp. Gearboxes were provided by Xtrac. The approximate running costs for a car over the course of the season was estimated to be between 350,000 and 400,000 euros.

Calendar
The provisional 2015 calendar was announced at the final round of the 2014 season in Estoril. The calendar once again comprised five events, featuring the same five circuits that hosted events in 2014. For the third consecutive season, Silverstone hosted the opening rounds of both the European Le Mans Series and the FIA World Endurance Championship.

Entry list
The entry list was announced on 5 February 2015.

LMP2

LMP3

LM GTE

GTC

Season results

Championship Standings

Points system

Teams Championships

LMP2

LMP3

LM GTE

GTC

Drivers Championships

LMP2 Standings (top-10)

LMP3 Standings (top-5)

LM GTE Standings (top-5)

GTC Standings (top-5)

Notes

References

External links
 

European Le Mans Series seasons
European Le Mans Series
Le Mans Series